Mohammadreza Zeynalkheiri is an Iranian footballer who plays for Mes Kerman in the Azadegan League.

Notes

References
 Mohammadreza Zeynalkheiri at Football Federation Islamic Republic of Iran

1990 births
Living people
Shahrdari Tabriz players
Iranian footballers
Sportspeople from Tabriz
Gostaresh Foulad F.C. players
Saipa F.C. players
Shahrdari Ardabil players
Sanat Mes Kerman F.C. players
Association football midfielders